The Fall River, Warren and Providence Railroad (also known as the Fall River Branch) was a railroad in southeastern Massachusetts and Rhode Island connecting the city of Fall River, Massachusetts with Warren, Rhode Island. It was incorporated in 1862 as a merger of the Warren and Fall River Railroad Company of Rhode Island and the Fall River and Warren Railroad Company of Massachusetts. The railroad line itself was not completed until 1865. It branched for 10 miles from the Providence, Warren and Bristol Railroad line in Warren, Rhode Island to Somerset, Massachusetts, directly across the Taunton River from Fall River via the Slade's Ferry Bridge. The line was abandoned and dismantled in 1937.

History 

In 1875, the line was connected to the Old Colony Railroad main line in Fall River with the opening of the Slade's Ferry Bridge. The Old Colony Railroad operated the line from 1875 until 1892 when it bought it outright. In 1893 the line became part of the New York, New Haven and Hartford Railroad upon its lease of the entire Old Colony Railroad system.

Route 
The branch would junction from Warren Station before making its way through Swansea and Somerset; the Slade's Ferry Bridge would exclusively carry the FRW&P line.  Despite its proximity to the FRW&P route, the Dighton and Somerset railroad would cross over the Taunton River at a drawbridge four miles upriver at Mallard's point.  The FRW&P would meet the Fall River mainline at Fall River Station where transfers could be made to other Old Colony lines.

Electrification 
Like the PW&B mainline, the FRW&P branch was completely electrified in 1900 with a 600 Volt DC single-wire trolley system.  A battery station was constructed on Brayton Point adjacent to the Slade's Ferry Bridge in Somerset; during rush hour periods, the battery stations would pick up some of the load, easing the burden on the Warren powerhouse. The branch was operated similarly to an interurban service under electrification. Electrification was never extended beyond Fall River Station.

Decline and abandonment 
The FRW&P was beginning to see a steady decline in ridership by the early 1930s.  In 1932, the Slade's Ferry Bridge was destroyed when a passing ship attempted to navigate past the swing section and collided with it. Since the FRW&P had no connection to the Dighton and Somerset line, it could no longer cross the Taunton River; this in effect ended all PW&B passenger service to Fall River. The Slade's Ferry Bridge would be renovated soon after with the removal of the railway span.

Electric service was cut back the same year before being entirely ceased on the PW&B in 1937.  The New Haven received ICC permission to abandon the line from East Warren to Slade's Ferry Bridge on June 11, 1937. The Slade's Ferry Bridge was subsequently bought by the state of Massachusetts as a highway bridge, with a lift drawbridge replacing the original swing section. The completion of the much higher Braga bridge (I-195) rendered the Slade's Ferry bridge a hazard to navigation and was demolished around 1965.

Unlike the PW&B line, little remains of the former the FRW&P branch.  Since the line had not been rail-banked, the line has been substantially built over. A 1-mile segment reopened as the Warren Bike Path in 2010. An expansion of the bike path in Warren began in 2021, including the rebuilding of the former bridge over the Kickemuit River, left destroyed after the 1938 Hurricane. The project is scheduled for completion in 2023. Some station structures, such as the former Touisset station in Swansea, are now private homes. The former Brayton Point battery station remains abandoned a few hundred feet west from the Somerset abutment of the former Slade's Ferry Bridge. Several bridge abutments are still extant in Swansea and Somerset.

Former stations

Gallery

References

Old Colony Railroad lines
Predecessors of the New York, New Haven and Hartford Railroad
1862 establishments in Massachusetts